Structural endogamy is a network concept that provides a means of finding the boundaries of endogamy in a community, using simply the genealogical and marriage linkages. The concept is related to that of structural cohesion. The examples are made with free tool Pajek. Another name for structural endogamy is (marital) relinking, which comes out of French social anthropology, and the study of how communities are formed through couples marrying who are already linked: linked, that is, by chains of kinship and marriage, as in circles of intermarrying families, or marriages between people with one or more ancestors in common (i.e., blood relatives, such as  cousins). Many of the marriages represented in the Turkish nomads figure are with cousins, for example. But relinking also occurs without blood marriages, as in the example from the Mexican village of Belén Atzitzi-mititlán within Apetatitlán de Antonio Carvajal.

References 
 Structural endogamy and the Graphe de Parenté. Mathématiques, Informatique, et Sciences Humaines 137:107-125. 1997. Douglas R. White
 Class, property and structural endogamy: Visualizing networked histories. Theory and Society 26:161-208. 1997. Lilyan A. Brudner and Douglas R. White.
 Network Analysis and Ethnographic Problems: Process Models of a Turkish Nomad Clan. 2004 (paper 2006). Douglas R. White and Ulla Johansen. Lexington Press.
 Status Groups and Structural Endogamy. 1998. Douglas R. White, Michael Schnegg, and Hugo G. Nutini

Anthropology
Social networks